Lindsay Davenport was the defending champion, but lost in the final to tournament winner Patty Schnyder 6–7(5–7), 7–6(10–8), 6–3.

It was the 1st title in the season for Schnyder and the 8th title of her career.

Seeds
The first four seeds received a bye into the second round.

Draw

Finals

Top half

Bottom half

Qualifying

Qualifying seeds

Qualifiers

Lucky loser
  Elena Bovina

Qualifying draw

First qualifier

Second qualifier

Third qualifier

Fourth qualifier

References

External links
 Main draw (WTA)
 Tournament profile (ITF)

2002 Singles
Swisscom Challenge - Singles